Phoradendron wiensii is a species of plant in the Santalaceae family. It is endemic to Ecuador.  Its natural habitat is subtropical or tropical moist montane forests.

References

Endemic flora of Ecuador
wiensii
Endangered plants
Taxonomy articles created by Polbot